McDermitt State Airport ,  is a public airport located ½ mile (0.75 km) northwest of McDermitt, Nevada in Malheur County, Oregon, USA.

External links
Airport Layout Plan (2003)

Airports in Malheur County, Oregon